Koheda is a village in Koheda mandal of Siddipet district in the state of Telangana in India.

References 

Villages in Siddipet district
Mandal headquarters in Siddipet district